Kamyzyak (Qumózek) is a town and the administrative center of Kamyzyaksky District in Astrakhan Oblast, Russia, located on the Kamyzyak River (a branch in the delta of the Volga),  south of Astrakhan, the administrative center of the oblast. Population:

History
Kamyzyak was founded around 1560 as a fishing village along the Volga. It was granted town status on February 2, 1973.

Administrative and municipal status
Within the framework of administrative divisions, Kamyzyak serves as the administrative center of Kamyzyaksky District. As an administrative division, it is incorporated within Kamyzyaksky District as the town of district significance of Kamyzyak. As a municipal division, the town of district significance of Kamyzyak is incorporated within Kamyzyaksky Municipal District as Kamyzyak Urban Settlement.

References

Notes

Sources

External links

Official website of Kamyzyak 
Kamyzyak Business Directory  
Mojgorod.ru. Entry on Kamyzyak 

Cities and towns in Astrakhan Oblast
Populated places established in 1560